Nälden is a locality situated in Krokom Municipality, Jämtland County, Sweden with 873 inhabitants in 2010.

References 

Populated places in Krokom Municipality
Jämtland